Qabıllı (also, Qarabullu, Gabylly, Gabullu and Kabullu) is a village and municipality in the Kangarli District of Nakhchivan, Azerbaijan. It is located in the near of the Sharur-Nakhchivan highway, 6 km away from the district center. Its population is busy with grain-growing, vegetable-growing, fodder and animal husbandry. There are secondary school, cultural house and a medical center in the village. It has a population of 1,079.

Etymology
The village's name is believed to be related with the name of the Gabullu tribe, one of the arms of the Turkic Kengerli tribe.

References 

Populated places in Kangarli District